The Roman Catholic Archdiocese of Seattle, formerly the Diocese of Nesqually from 1850–1907, is an ecclesiastical territory or archdiocese of the Catholic Church (particularly the Roman Catholic or Latin Church) located in the U.S. state of Washington. Headquartered in Seattle, the archdiocese encompasses all counties in the state west of the Cascade Range.

, its archbishop is Paul D. Etienne.

Its cathedral of the archiepiscopal see is St. James Cathedral in Seattle, and the former cathedral is the Proto-Cathedral of St. James the Greater, in Vancouver, Washington.

The archdiocese succeeded to the Diocese of Nesqually headquartered in Vancouver, Washington, established in 1850 as a suffragan diocese of the Archdiocese of Oregon City. In 1903, the episcopal see was moved to Seattle, and the diocese's name was changed to Diocese of Seattle in 1907. The diocese was elevated to metropolitan archdiocesan status in 1951.

Ecclesiastical province 
The Archbishop of Seattle concurrently is the Metropolitan Archbishop of two suffragan daughter dioceses within the Ecclesiastical Province of Seattle, which together cover the entire state of Washington :
 Roman Catholic Diocese of Spokane, carved out of the Archdiocese of Seattle territory in 1913
 Roman Catholic Diocese of Yakima, carved out of the Archdiocese of Seattle territory in 1951.

Statistics and extent 
As per 2014 it pastorally served 997,000 Catholics (18.6% of 5,350,045 total) on 64,269 km² in 147 parishes with 298 priests (204 diocesan, 94 religious), 116 deacons, 476 lay religious (109 brothers, 367 sisters) and 800 lay ecclesial ministers.

The Archdiocese encompasses all of Western Washington, 64,269 km², stretching from the Canadian to the Oregon border and from the Cascade Mountains to the Pacific Ocean, including 19 counties.

In this area, 972,000 people identify as Catholic, almost 19% of the total population of 5,202,500.

There are 144 parishes, and an additional 37 missions, stations, and pastoral centers. Only 106 of these have resident priest-pastors.

These parishes and other centers are served by 115 active diocesan priests, 118 diocesan deacons, approximately 800 diocesan lay ecclesial ministers, and 530 religious women and men (including priests). The archbishop is assisted by two auxiliary bishops, and there are two retired archbishops still living.

There are 11 Catholic Hospitals, 2 Health Care Centers, 19 Homes for the elderly, 3 day care centers, 10 specialized homes, and 111 centers for social services.

There are 2 Catholic universities, 11 high schools, 62 elementary schools.

16,831 elementary students are served through parochial and private schools; 29,850 through parochial religious education programs.

2420 high school students are served through diocesan and private schools; 6580 through parochial religious education and youth ministry programs.

History 

The presence of the Catholic Church in the present state of Washington dates to the 1830s, when missionary priests François Norbert Blanchet and Modeste Demers traveled from Quebec and arrived in what was then known as the Oregon Country. On December 1, 1843, the Holy See established the Vicariate Apostolic of the Oregon Territory and named Blanchet its vicar apostolic. In 1846 Pope Gregory XVI established an ecclesiastical territory in the region, and the apostolic vicariate was split into three dioceses: Diocese of Oregon City with François Blanchet as bishop; Diocese of Vancouver Island, with Demers as bishop, and Diocese of Walla Walla at Walla Walla, Washington, with François Blanchet's brother, Augustin-Magloire Blanchet, as bishop.

The Whitman massacre in 1847 and the ensuing Cayuse War increased tensions between Christians and the native population of the Oregon Territory, and as a result by 1850 the Diocese of Walla Walla was abandoned and its merged-in territory administered from Oregon City.
 
On May 31, 1850, Pope Pius IX created the Diocese of Nesqually out of the defunct Walla Walla diocese, with Augustin Blanchet as bishop. In January 1851, Augustin Blanchet dedicated St. James Church near Fort Vancouver as the new diocese's cathedral. A new St. James Cathedral was built in Vancouver, Washington in 1885.

In 1903 Bishop Edward O'Dea, realizing that Vancouver was no longer the economic and population center of the region, moved the episcopal see to Seattle and began construction on a new cathedral in 1905. The Holy See changed the name to Diocese of Seattle on September 11, 1907, and the present-day St. James Cathedral was dedicated on December 22, 1907.

On December 12, 1913, it lost territory to establish the Diocese of Spokane, now its oldest suffragan.

It was elevated on June 23, 1951 as Metropolitan Archdiocese of Seattle and Bishop Thomas Arthur Connolly became the first archbishop. Simultaneously it lost territory to establish the Diocese of Yakima, its second suffragan.

In 1983, Cardinal Joseph Ratzinger, then Prefect of the Congregation for the Doctrine of the Faith (CDF), initiated an apostolic visitation to the Archdiocese of Seattle. The visitation was largely prompted by concerns over whether the archdiocese under Archbishop Raymond Hunthausen was adhering to church teachings on matters including contraception in Catholic hospitals and its treatment of homosexuals and divorced people. Archbishop James Hickey of the Archdiocese of Washington, DC was sent to Seattle to gather information on behalf of the CDF. As a result of the CDF's findings, on December 3, 1985, Pope John Paul II appointed Donald Wuerl auxiliary bishop of Seattle with "special faculties" that included the authority to overrule Archbishop Hunthausen in several areas. This unusual arrangement proved unpopular among the people of the archdiocese, and Wuerl was replaced with Thomas Murphy on May 26, 1987. Murphy was appointed as coadjutor archbishop, and thus automatically became the archbishop with Hunthausen's retirement on August 21, 1991.

Under Archbishop Murphy, the archdiocese saw an increase in registered Catholics and an increase in lay ministries and outreach for women and various ethnic groups. He was diagnosed with acute myeloid leukemia in December 1996, and died on June 26, 1997. Father George Leo Thomas was appointed administrator of the archdiocese until the installation of Archbishop Alexander Joseph Brunett in December 1997. Brunett later appointed and consecrated George Thomas as auxiliary bishop, a post he held until his appointment as Bishop of Helena in 2004. Eusebio L. Elizondo Almaguer and Joseph J. Tyson were appointed as auxiliary bishops and consecrated in 2005; Elizondo still serves in that capacity, while Tyson departed in 2011 to become Bishop of suffragan see Yakima. Brunett served as archbishop until his retirement in 2011 and was succeeded by J. Peter Sartain.  On April 29, 2019, Pope Francis named Paul D. Etienne, serving at the time as Archbishop of Anchorage, Alaska, as the Coadjutor Archbishop of Seattle in anticipation of Archbishop Sartain's retirement. Etienne succeeded Sartain on September 3, 2019, when Pope Francis accepted his resignation.

Bishops

Bishops of Nesqually
 Augustin-Magloire Blanchet (1850–1879)
 Egidius Junger (1879–1895)
 Edward John O'Dea (1896–1907), title changed to Bishop of Seattle

Bishops of Seattle
 Edward John O'Dea (1907–1932)
 Gerald Shaughnessy (1933–1950)
 Thomas Arthur Connolly (1950–1951), elevated to Archbishop

Archbishops of Seattle
 Thomas Arthur Connolly (1951–1975)
 Raymond Hunthausen (1975–1991)
 Thomas Joseph Murphy (1991–1997; coadjutor 1987-1991)
 Alexander Joseph Brunett (1997–2010)
 J. Peter Sartain (2010–2019)
 Paul D. Etienne (2019–present; coadjutor 2019)

Current Auxiliary Bishops
 Eusebio L. Elizondo Almaguer (2005–present)
 Frank R. Schuster (2022-present)

Former Auxiliary Bishops
 Thomas Edward Gill (1956–1973)
 Nicolas Eugene Walsh (1976–1983)
 Donald Wuerl (1986–1988) appointed Bishop of Pittsburgh and later Archbishop of Washington (Cardinal in 2010)
 George Leo Thomas (2000–2004) appointed Bishop of Helena and later Bishop of Las Vegas
 Joseph J. Tyson (2005–2011), appointed Bishop of Yakima
 Daniel Henry Mueggenborg (2017–2021), appointed Bishop of Reno.

Other priests of this diocese who became Bishops
 Robert John Armstrong, appointed Bishop of Sacramento in 1929
 Jean-Baptiste Brondel, appointed Bishop of Vancouver Island in 1879
 Joseph Patrick Dougherty, appointed Bishop of Yakima in 1951
 Cornelius Michael Power, appointed Bishop of Yakima in 1969

High schools 
 Archbishop Murphy High School* - Everett
 Bellarmine Preparatory School* - Tacoma
 Bishop Blanchet High School - Seattle
 Eastside Catholic School* - Sammamish
 Forest Ridge School of the Sacred Heart* - Bellevue
 Holy Names Academy* -  Seattle
 John F. Kennedy Catholic High School -  Burien
 O'Dea High School -  Seattle
 Pope John Paul II High School* - Lacey
 Seattle Preparatory School* -  Seattle
 St. Elizabeth Ann Seton Catholic High School* - Vancouver
 * Operationally independent of Archdiocese

See also 

 Catholic Church in the United States
 Global organisation of the Catholic Church
 List of Catholic dioceses (alphabetical) (including archdioceses)
 List of Catholic dioceses (structured view) (including archdioceses)
 List of Catholic dioceses in the United States

References

Sources and external links 
 Roman Catholic Archdiocese of Seattle Official Site
 GCatholic - Seattle see, with Google map and satellite photo - data for most sections
 Northwest Catholic - diocesan magazine
 St. James Cathedral

 
 
Roman Catholic Archdiocese of Seattle
Roman Catholic dioceses and prelatures established in the 19th century
Roman Catholic dioceses in the United States
1850 establishments in Oregon Territory
Roman Catholic Archdiocese
Religion in Seattle